Pope John Paul is the name of two Popes of the Roman Catholic Church and the only papal name with two names:
Pope John Paul I (1978), named after his predecessors John XXIII and Paul VI; died 33 days after his election
Pope John Paul II (1978–2005), named after his predecessor John Paul I.

Other 
"Pope John Paul", a song by the Montreal-based band The Lovely Feathers on their album Hind Hind Legs.
Pope John Paul III, the titular character in the 2020 TV show The New Pope

See also

 
 
 Pope John Paul II (disambiguation)
 Pope John (disambiguation)
 Pope Paul (disambiguation)
 John Paul (disambiguation)
 John (disambiguation)
 Paul (disambiguation)
 Pope (disambiguation)

John Paul